Inguinal lymphadenopathy causes swollen lymph nodes in the groin area. It can be a symptom of infective or neoplastic processes.
Infective aetiologies include Tuberculosis, HIV, non-specific or reactive lymphadenopathy to recent lower limb infection or groin infections.  Another notable infectious cause is Lymphogranuloma venereum, which is a sexually transmitted infection of the lymphatic system.  Neoplastic aetiologies include lymphoma, leukaemia and metastatic disease from primary tumours in the lower limb, external genitalia or perianal region and melanoma.

References

Further reading
 

Inflammations
Diseases of veins, lymphatic vessels and lymph nodes